William Belcher (c.1860–15 June 1926) was a New Zealand seaman and unionist. He was born in London, England on c.1860.

References

1860 births
1926 deaths
New Zealand trade unionists
English emigrants to New Zealand